The climate of Pennsylvania is diverse due to the multitude of geographic features found within the state.  Straddling two major climate zones, the southeastern corner of Pennsylvania has the warmest climate.  A portion of Greater Philadelphia lies at the southernmost tip of the humid continental climate zone, with the city proper being in the humid subtropical climate zone. Still, Philadelphia features colder, snowier winters than most locations with a humid subtropical climate. Moving west toward the mountainous interior of the state, the climate becomes markedly colder, the number of cloudy days increases, and winter snowfall amounts are greater.

Using the January freezing isotherm, the humid subtropical climate (Cfa) only exists in parts of Greater Philadelphia and low-lying areas of the lower Susquehanna Valley from Harrisburg downriver. Pennsylvania's hardiness zone ranges from 5a in high-elevation areas to 7b in parts of Delaware and Philadelphia Counties.

Precipitation
Floods are more common in March and April than other months of the year.

Tropical cyclones
Tropical cyclones normally threaten the states during the summer and fall, with their main impact being rainfall. These rains produced widespread severe flooding from Virginia northward to New York, with other flooding occurring over the western portions of the Carolinas.

Philadelphia has received sustained winds approaching hurricane-force from tropical cyclones in the past.

Climate extremes

Temperature

Precipitation

Rain

Note: While the official measured rainfall record is given above, the NCDC notes that an estimated  of rain fell in 12 hours near Smethport on July 17, 1942. The NCDC says this is "arguably the greatest 24-hour rainfall on record outside of the tropics".

Snow

Hurricanes

Climate statistics for selected cities

See also
Johnstown Flood
List of wettest known tropical cyclones in Pennsylvania
Wind power in Pennsylvania

Notes

References

 
Pennsylvania